Norman Carton (January 7, 1908 – February 14, 1980) was an American artist and educator known for abstract expressionist art. He was born in the Ukraine region of Imperial Russia and moved to the United States in 1922 where he spent most of his adult life.

A classically trained portrait and landscape artist, Carton also worked as a drafter, newspaper illustrator, muralist, theater set designer, photographer, and fabric designer and spent most of his mature life as an art educator. Carton showed in and continues to be shown in many solo and group exhibitions. His work is included in numerous museums and private collections throughout the world.



Early life
Norman Carton was born in the Dnieper Ukraine territory of the Russian Empire in 1908. Escaping the turbulence of civil war massacres, he settled in Philadelphia in 1922 after years of constant flight.

While attending the Pennsylvania Museum School of Industrial Art, Carton worked as a newspaper artist for the Philadelphia Record from 1928 to 1930 in the company of other illustrator/artists who had founded the Ashcan School, the beginnings of modern American art. From 1930 to 1935, he studied at the Pennsylvania Academy of Fine Arts under Henry McCarter, who was a pupil of Toulouse-Lautrec, Puvis de Chavanne, and Thomas Eakins.  Arthur Carles, especially with his sense of color, and the architect John Harbison also provided tutelage and inspiration. Following his time at the Pennsylvania Academy of Fine Arts, Carton studied at the Barnes Foundation from 1935 to 1936 where he was influenced by an intellectual climate led by visiting lecturers John Dewey and Bertrand Russell as well as daily access to Albert C. Barnes and his art collection.

Carton was awarded the Cresson Traveling Scholarship in 1934 which allowed him to travel through Europe and study in Paris. There he expanded his artistic horizons with influences stemming from Matisse, Picasso, Soutine, and Kandinsky. While at the Pennsylvania Academy of Fine Arts, Carton was also awarded the Toppan Prize for figure painting as well as the Thouron Composition Prize.  He received numerous commissions as a portrait artist, social realist, sculptor, and theatrical stage designer as well as academic scholarships. During this time, Carton worked as a scenery designer at Sparks Scenic Studios, a drafter at the Philadelphia Enameling Works, and a fine art lithographer.

Career

Early career

From 1939 to 1942, the Works Progress Administration (WPA) Federal Art Project employed Carton as a muralist and easel artist. He collaborated with architect George Howe. The WPA commissioned Carton to paint major murals at the Helen Fleischer Vocational School for Girls in Philadelphia,  the Officers’ Club at Camp Meade Army Base in Maryland, and in the city of Hidalgo, Mexico.

Throughout the 1940s, Carton exhibited and won prizes for his semi-abstract Expressionist and Surrealist paintings. He socialized with and was inspired by Émile Gaugin and Fernand Léger. During World War II, Carton was a naval structural designer and draftsman at the Cramps Shipbuilding Corporation in Camden, New Jersey. Here, he created non-objective sculpture with metal.

After the war, Carton co-founded a fabric design plant in Philadelphia. He produced hand-printed fabrics for interiors and fashion that were featured in Harper’s Bazaar, Vogue and Women’s Wear Daily. Original fabric designs were commissioned by notable clients including Lord & Taylor, Gimbels, and Nina Ricci. Some of these designs are at the Metropolitan Museum of Art.  Carton traded his partnership in the fabric design company in 1949 to focus full-time on painting.

Carton had his first solo exhibition in 1949 at the Philadelphia Art Alliance.  This show was followed closely by solo exhibitions at the Laurel Gallery (New York City) and Dubin Gallery (Philadelphia). At this time, his exhibited work was Abstract Impressionist. In addition to painting, he taught classes at the Philadelphia Museum of Art and was the Founder and first President of the Philadelphia chapter of Artist’s Equity Association.

The Philadelphia Museum of Art and the organization of the National Museums of France commissioned Carton to travel to Europe, mainly France, in 1950 for a color photography study of continental masterpieces. He was granted access to study the restoration of the Mona Lisa and was one of the very few to be given permission to remove the painting from its frame.

During his three year stay in Paris, he had solo exhibits at La Sorbonne and Gallery Rene Breteau and was in 15 group shows in Paris salons including Les Surindependants, Salon d’Automne, and Realities Nouvelles. He also exhibited at the Musee d’Art Juif where he won the Prix d’Art. The Cercle Paul Valery twice sponsored Carton to present lectures at the Sorbonne. He conducted seminars at the Louvre for the Cercle Esthetique Internationale and taught classes in and directed stage and costume design for the Theatre de Recherche at the Paris Opera. Among his Paris artist colleagues were Chana Orloff, Earl Kerkam, Sam Francis, Claire Falkenstein, Lawrence Calcagno, Norman Bluhm, and Al Held.

Maturing career 

When Carton returned to the United States in 1953, he settled in New York City where he worked in the company of the leading artists of the day with whom he appeared in a number of group shows including the Whitney Museum of American Art's 1955-1956 “Exhibit of Contemporary American Painting.” This exhibition included such notable artists as Richard Diebenkorn, Joan Mitchell, James Brooks, Grace Hartigan, Franz Kline, Georgia O'Keeffe, Adolph Gottlieb, Robert De Niro Sr., and many others. The Whitney subsequently purchased a Carton.

The mid-1950s to the 1970s was a busy time for Carton during which he received a great deal of recognition. He had solo exhibitions one gallery after another: Martha Jackson, Staempfli, Granite and World House, New York City; Tirca Carlis, Provincetown; Gres, Washington D.C.; Dumbarton, Boston; and Joachim, Chicago. 

Carton's large canvasses traveled in major collections to such venues as the Smithsonian American Art Museum (was SNCFA) and the RISD Museum of Fine Arts with significant works of artists such as Jim Dine, Hans Hofmann, Robert Motherwell, Louise Nevelson, and Jackson Pollock. Other group exhibitions included Whitney, Corcoran, Phillips, Dallas, Dayton, Walker, and Chrysler Museums among others.  

Among his NYC artist colleagues were also now Louise Nevelson and John Hultberg who he had helped welcome at the Martha Jackson Gallery. In 1962, with the aid of two other artists, he formed the Dewey Gallery, one of the first New York City galleries owned and operated by artists. He presented his work during the opening exhibition.

During his lifetime, Carton was in at least 150 group exhibits and more than 20 solo shows and continued to receive many PAFA fellowship awards.  He was popularly and critically regarded as possessing a painterly style of superlative action and a unique knowledge as a colorist, Carton ground his own pigments and painted with a brilliant palette. More recently, he exhibited with Willem de Kooning and Mark Rothko among other great Abstract Expressionists as well as Picasso and Matisse.

Art educator
Norman Carton was also an art educator throughout much of his life.  Beginning in 1960, Carton worked on the art faculty at the New School where he would remain until his death. From 1948 to 1949, he taught painting and composition at the Philadelphia Museum of Art. From 1950 to 1953, he conducted seminars at the Louvre and the Sorbonne while living in Paris. Also while in Paris, Carton taught classes in and directed stage and costume design for the Theatre de Recherche at the Paris Opera. He also gave lectures at the Pratt Institute and the Chrysler Museum of Art as well as the Whitney Museum of American Art. Carton moderated panel discussions between prominent artists and educators and appeared in radio interviews. In 1960 and 1961, he painted at the MacDowell Colony in New Hampshire as a fellow. Carton also taught for a time at Long Island University.

Personal life
Norman Carton had two children, sons Jacob and Benedict Carton.  He died of a heart attack at Doctors Hospital in New York City in 1980 at the age of 72.

Legacy
Norman Carton has had more than 25 solo exhibitions and was part of over 175 group exhibitions. His work is currently in more than 20 museums and hundreds of private collections throughout the world.

Carton's works continue to be included in present day exhibitions including at Hollis Taggart Gallery entitled Wild and Brilliant: The Martha Jackson Gallery and Post-War Art, Quogue Gallery entitled 1950s and 1960s Works on Paper, the Nassau County Museum of Art entitled Blue in 2020 as well as Energy: The Power of Art in 2019 and at the Anita Shapolsky Gallery in 2019 entitled Inspiration & Exploration.

Norman Carton's 2020 solo exhibition at Quogue Gallery was reviewed by Charles A Riley II

A representational portion of Carton's papers which include correspondence, writings, notes, exhibition catalogs and sketchbooks were donated to the Smithsonian Archives of American Art where they remain.

Selected museum collections
Many museums hold Norman Carton's works in their permanent collections. Below is a selected list of museums which hold Carton's works
 Albright–Knox Art Gallery, Buffalo, New York
 Blanton Museum of Art, University of Texas at Austin
 Chrysler Museum of Art, Norfolk VA
 Fonds National d'Art Contemporain / Center National d'Arts Plastiques, Paris
 Michelson Museum of Art, Marshall, Texas
 Montclair Art Museum, Montclair, New Jersey
 Moscow Conservatory, Moscow, Russia
 Musée d'art moderne (Saint-Étienne, France), 1954-1992
 Musée d'Art et d'Histoire du Judaïsme, Paris, France
 Museo Nacional de Bellas Artes de La Habana, Havana, Cuba
 Museum of Fine Arts, Budapest, Hungary
 National Gallery of Art, Washington, D.C.
 Neuberger Museum of Art, Purchase, New York
 Palmer Museum of Art, State College, Pennsylvania
 Pennsylvania Academy of the Fine Arts, Philadelphia, Pennsylvania
 Rhode Island School of Design Museum, Providence, Rhode Island
 The New School Art Collection, New York, New York
 Whitney Museum of American Art, New York, New York
 Yale University Art Gallery, New Haven, Connecticut
 Zimmerli Art Museum, Rutgers University, New Jersey

Selected works

References

External links 

 Norman Carton papers, 1949-1980 at the Smithsonian Archives of American Art

1908 births
1980 deaths
20th-century American male artists
American abstract artists
Pennsylvania Academy of the Fine Arts alumni
Emigrants from the Russian Empire to the United States
American expatriates in France
Artists from New York City
Artists from Philadelphia
American muralists
Works Progress Administration workers